This page lists examples of the power in watts produced by various sources of energy. They are grouped by orders of magnitude from small to large.

Below 1 W

1 to 102 W

103 to 108 W

The productive capacity of electrical generators operated by utility companies is often measured in MW.  Few things can sustain the transfer or consumption of energy on this scale; some of these events or entities include: lightning strikes, naval craft (such as aircraft carriers and submarines), engineering hardware, and some scientific research equipment (such as supercolliders and large lasers).

For reference, about 10,000 100-watt lightbulbs or 5,000 computer systems would be needed to draw 1 MW.  Also, 1 MW is approximately 1360 horsepower. Modern high-power diesel-electric locomotives typically have a peak power of 3–5 MW, while a typical modern nuclear power plant produces on the order of 500–2000 MW peak output.

109 to 1014 W

1015 to 1026 W

Over 1027 W

See also
Orders of magnitude (energy)
Orders of magnitude (voltage)
World energy resources and consumption
International System of Units (SI)
SI prefix

Notes

References

Power
Power (physics)